Lee Hui-gyeong (born 29 April 1975) is a South Korean gymnast. She competed in five events at the 1992 Summer Olympics.

References

1975 births
Living people
South Korean female artistic gymnasts
Olympic gymnasts of South Korea
Gymnasts at the 1992 Summer Olympics
Place of birth missing (living people)
Asian Games medalists in gymnastics
Gymnasts at the 1990 Asian Games
Asian Games silver medalists for South Korea
Asian Games bronze medalists for South Korea
Medalists at the 1990 Asian Games
20th-century South Korean women